Fantasy Patrol  is a Russian computer-animated fantasy web television series created by Vadim Volya and Evgeniy Golovin. The series premiered on the multi-series newsreel, Moolt in Cinema on April 30, 2016, and was later released to YouTube on May 19, 2016.

Series overview

Episodes

Season 1 (2016–18)

Season 2 (2019–20)

Season 3 (2021–present)

The Chronicles (2019–20)

A spin-off series to Fantasy Patrol, titled Fantasy Patrol: The Chronicles, premiered on August 2, 2019.

Film (2021)

An animated film based on Fantasy Patrol, "Koshchey: The True Story", is originally scheduled to release in 2020, but it was delayed to 2021 due to the.

References

2010s television-related lists
Lists of Russian animated television series episodes